Milan Chams (born 20 March 1980) is a director of Nepali films. He is best known for the films Bir Bikram and Lily Bily which have received a number of awards. Other films he directed include Bir Bikram 2.

Chams caused an uproar when he filed charges against stand-up comedian Pranesh Gautam after the latter gave a satirical review of Bir Bikram 2. His critics accused him of bullying and harassing movie critics upon getting negative reviews.

Bir Bikram 2 was widely panned by the critics. It was criticized for its sexist overtones and also accused of plagiarizing scenes from 'Sholay', a hit Bollywood film from the 70's.

Filmography 
 Paschatap (Director)
 Hasiya (Director)
 Bir Bikram (Producer, Director)
 Blind Rocks (Producer, Director)
 Happy Days (Director)
 Lily Bily (Director)
 Bobby (Producer, Director)
 Bir Bikram 2 (Producer, Director)
 Bobby 2  (Producer, Director)

Awards and nominations

References

External links 
 

1980 births
Living people
Nepalese film directors
Nepalese screenwriters
Nepalese film producers
People from Kathmandu
21st-century Nepalese screenwriters
21st-century Nepalese film directors